Josh Thompson may refer to:

Josh Thompson (gridiron football) (born 1985), American football defensive tackle
Josh Thompson (defensive back) (born 1998), American football cornerback
Josh Thompson (biathlete) (born 1962), retired American biathlete and pilot
Josh Thompson (footballer) (born 1991), English footballer
Josh Thompson (singer) (born 1978), American country music artist
Josh Robert Thompson (born 1975), American actor, impressionist and comedian
Joshua Spencer Thompson (1828–1880), Canadian journalist and politician
Josh Thompson (runner) (born 1993), American runner

See also
Josh Thomson (born 1978), American MMA fighter
Josh Thomson (actor) (born 1981), New Zealand actor and comedian